Da Kink in My Hair was a Canadian television sitcom. Based on the play of the same name by Trey Anthony, the story was adapted into a television show and aired on Global during prime time. It was the first comedy series on a national private mainstream broadcaster that was created by and starring Black women in Canada. The series had centred on a hair salon in the heart of Toronto's Caribbean-Canadian community, Eglinton West. The series debuted on Global on October 14, 2007, and the final episode aired on May 14, 2009.  It was the winner of the Canadian Association of Broadcasters Best Fiction Series prize in 2008 and won a Gemini Award for Best Hair. The series has been rebroadcast on Television Jamaica.

Cast
The show stars Ordena Stephens-Thompson as Novelette "Letty" Campbell, the Caribbean-Canadian owner of a hair salon in Toronto. Trey Anthony, the writer of the original play on which the series was based, also stars as Letty's sister Joy.

The original cast also included Ngozi Paul, Richard Fagon, and Conroy Stewart. In season 2, the role of Dre was recast and Daniel J. Gordon assumed the role created by Stewart.

Characters

Main characters
Ordena Stephens-Thompson as Novelette "Letty" Campbell. Letty is the Jamaican-Canadian owner of the salon. Originally from Spanish Town, Jamaica, she is the mother of Dre (Conray Stewart/Daniel J. Gordon) and the sister of Joy (Trey Anthony) and has a brother Winston who lives in Kingston. Letty has been living in Canada for seven years prior to the beginning of the series and opened up "Letty's Hair Salon" not long after. She is very proud of her business and enjoys working as well trying to make people happy. Letty is dedicated to her business and knows how important the shop is to its clients, most of whom are recent women immigrants from The Caribbean. Letty recently sent for her sister Joy and son Dre, whom Joy raised while Letty was in Canada. Letty, however, is unimpressed by the way Joy raised him and wants to raise him by her rules. Despite this, the two both co-raise the young boy. A running gag throughout the first season is that Letty hasn't been on a date in over seven years.
Trey Anthony as Joy Campbell. Joy is Letty's younger sister and the shop receptionist. Originally from Spanish Town, Jamaica, Joy recently arrived in Toronto after Letty sent her for her and Letty's teenage son Dre, who Joy raised while Letty was trying to send for them to join her in Canada. Joy is known for her very colourful weaves, her vibrant fun-loving personality, as well as her outspoken attitude. A running gag throughout the series is that Joy would rather be back home in Jamaica than in Canada, where she doesn't like the laws and rules. Joy is also a hopeless romantic who is openly disapproving when black men date interracially. In the first season, Joy dated Gary, a successful Jamaican-Canadian real estate agent, whom she broke up with later in the season due to his abusive behaviour and demanding attitude. 
Ngozi Paul as Allison "Starr" McMasterson. Starr is an African-Canadian trainee at the salon. Adopted by a white family, she was raised in an all-white environment in Peterborough, Ontario so to discover herself as a black woman she moved to Toronto after quitting law school and began working at the salon. During the first season, Starr was ashamed of her adoptive family but later grew to accept them. Although Starr stated she "does not date black men", she had a brief crush and flirtation with her coworker Nigel before he got back with his ex. A running gag throughout the series is that Starr knows nothing of West Indian culture.
Richard Fagon as Nigel. A first-generation Jamaican Canadian, Nigel is a stylist at the salon who is known for his womanizing ways. Whenever an ex entered the shop Nigel would ask Letty for a break. He also had a brief flirtationship with Starr before he began dating Nikki. Although he only appeared in the first season, Nigel was a major character who would jokingly make fun of Starr, about her being "whitewashed" and nothing little of West Indian culture. The character of Nigel did not return in the second season.

Episodes

Season 1 (2007–08)

Season 2 (2009)

Ratings
The show was a hit in its Sunday night 7:30pm time slot achieving solid 2's and 3's in the first two episodes. Due to a scheduling mishap and a lack of communication with the audience, after being preempted for two weeks it returned with 1.5's  and rose steadily to complete the season.

Global announced on March 20, 2008, that the show would be renewed for a second season.  The second season premiered on Global on February 12, 2009, and was scheduled to start in the middle of Grey's Anatomy. It proved to be the death knell for the show because they shared the same audience.

References

External links

 

2000s Canadian sitcoms
2000s Canadian comedy-drama television series
2007 Canadian television series debuts
2009 Canadian television series endings
Global Television Network original programming
Television series based on plays
Canadian black sitcoms
Television shows set in Toronto
Black Canadian culture in Toronto
Television shows filmed in Toronto
English-language television shows
Television series by Entertainment One
2000s Black Canadian television series